Hallie H. Rowe (July 3, 1896 – September 28, 1992) was a member of the Wisconsin State Assembly.

Biography
Rowe was born on July 3, 1896, in Weyauwega, Wisconsin. He later moved to Sturgeon Bay, Wisconsin. During World War I, he served in the United States Army.

Political career
Rowe was a member of the Assembly from 1949 to 1950. Previously, he was Sheriff of Door County, Wisconsin from 1945 to 1948. He was a Republican.

Rowe died in Sturgeon Bay on September 28, 1992. He was buried at Bayside Cemetery in Sturgeon Bay.

References

People from Weyauwega, Wisconsin
People from Sturgeon Bay, Wisconsin
Military personnel from Wisconsin
United States Army soldiers
United States Army personnel of World War I
1896 births
1992 deaths
Republican Party members of the Wisconsin State Assembly